Pasteuria nishizawae is a mycelial and endospore-forming bacterium parasitic on cyst nematodes of genera Heterodera and Globodera.

References

Further reading

External links

LPSN

Bacillales
Bacteria described in 1992